Sharda International School is an Indian co–educational, senior secondary school (or high school). The English-speaking institution was established in 1994, in the city of Gurgaon, Haryana and serves students ages 14–18. The school has been honored with ISO 9001:2000 certification in recognition of their students receiving 100 percent testing scores on the Central Board of Secondary Education (CBSE) Board Examinations.

History 
Sharda International School was founded on 14 December 1994, by Shri Narendra Kumar Rao. They opened their doors in April 1995. The school is accredited by the Central Board of Secondary Education and operates under the authority of the Shri Hardhyan Singh Memorial Education Society.

Classes offered 
Science
 Physics
 Chemistry
 Biology
 Mathematics
 Computer Science
 Physical Education

Commerce

 Accounting
 Economics
 Business

References

External links
 Sharda International School

High schools and secondary schools in Haryana
International schools in India
Schools in Gurgaon
Educational institutions established in 1994
1994 establishments in Haryana